John Harney may refer to:
 John Paul Harney, Canadian professor and politician
 John Hopkins Harney, American politician in Kentucky
 John Milton Harney, American physician and poet
 John Harney, founder of American tea company Harney & Sons